Yeah! is the third studio album by the hard rock band Brownsville Station.  It was their highest charting album, reaching number 98 on the Billboard 200.

The single "Smokin' in the Boy's Room" reached number three on U.S. Billboard Hot 100 chart and number 27 in the UK Singles Chart.  Some British and Irish LP releases used the album title Smokin' in the Boy's Room.

Track listing
Side one
 "Question of Temperature" (Mike Appel, Ed Schnug, Don Henny) - 3:31
 "Lightnin' Bar Blues" (Hoyt Axton) - 2:52
 "Take It or Leave It" (H. Cardell) - 3:00
 "All Night Long" (Mike Lutz, Cub Koda) - 2:55
 "Let Your Yeah Be Yeah" (Jimmy Cliff) - 3:37
Side two
 "Sweet Jane" (Lou Reed) - 3:02
 "Love, Love, Love" (Terry Knight) - 2:55
 "Go Out and Get Her" (Doug Morris) - 2:56
 "Barefootin'" (Robert Parker) - 2:55
 "Smokin' in the Boy's Room" (Mike Lutz, Cub Koda) - 2:57

Personnel
Brownsville Station
 Cub Kodaguitar, vocals
 Mike Lutzbass, vocals
 Henry "H Bomb" Weckdrums
Technical
Michael Deluggengineer
Beverly Weinsteinart direction
Rob Nalliphotography

References

1973 albums
Brownsville Station (band) albums
Big Tree Records albums